Bosnians (Serbo-Croatian:  / ;   / ,   / ) are people identified with the country of Bosnia and Herzegovina or with the region of Bosnia. As a common demonym, the term Bosnians refers to all inhabitants/citizens of the country, regardless of any ethnic, cultural or religious affiliation. It can also be used as a designation for anyone who is descended from the region of Bosnia. Also, a Bosnian can be anyone who holds citizenship of the state of Bosnia and Herzegovina and thus is largely synonymous with the all-encompassing national demonym Bosnians and Herzegovinians. This includes, but is not limited to, members of the constituent ethnic groups of Bosnia and Herzegovina: Bosniaks, Serbs, and Croats.

As a common demonym, the term Bosnians should not be confused with somewhat similar, but not identical ethnonym Bosniaks, designating ethnic Bosniaks. The main ethnic groups of Bosnia and Herzegovina include Bosniaks, Croats, and Serbs.

Terminology

In modern English, term Bosnians is the most commonly used exonym for the general population of Bosnia. In older English literature, inhabitants of Bosnia were sometimes also referred to as Bosniacs or Bosniaks. All of those terms (Bosnians, Bosniacs, Bosniaks) were used interchangeably, as common demonyms for the entire population of Bosnia, including all ethnic and religious groups. When pointing to different religious affiliations within the general population of Bosnia, English authors were using common terms like Christian Bosniacs, or Mohammedan Bosniacs, and also Christian Bosniaks, or Mohammedan Bosniaks.

Since the end of the 20th century, when the majority of ethnic Muslims in former Yugoslavia re-affirmed Bosniak as their ethnic designation, consequent use of that particular term in English language has gradually adapted to the new situation. Today, term Bosniaks (including the spelling variant Bosniacs) is primarily used in English language as a designation for ethnic Bosniaks, while the term Bosnians has kept its general meaning, designating all inhabitants of Bosnia.

There was a case to have right for people to identify themselves as Bosnians in the European Court of Human Rights that won.

History

Medieval Bosnians

The name Bosnia as a polity was first recorded in the middle of the 10th century, in the Greek form Βόσονα, designating the region. By that time, the Migration Period of the Early Middle Ages was already over. During that turbulent period, from the beginning of the 6th, up to middle of the 7th century, the Early Slavs have invaded the Byzantine Empire and settled throughout the Southeastern Europe. In many regions, they encountered various groups of the previously romanized population of the former Roman provinces of Dalmatia, Praevalitana, Pannonia Secunda, Pannonia Savia and others. The remaining romanized population retreated mainly to mountainous regions, while South Slavic tribes settled in plains and valleys, gradually coalescing into early principalities. As these expanded, they came to include other surrounding territories, and later evolved into more centralized states.

During the twelfth century, the Banate of Bosnia was created, centered in the valley of the river Bosna. There are several theories among linguists and other scholars regarding the origins of both terms, for the region and the river, and also regarding the relation between those two terms. It is speculated that the name Bosnia could be drawn from an older regional term, itself originally derived from the name of the Bosna river, which flows through the heart of the land. From that root, local demonym was derived in endonym form of Bošnjani, designating the inhabitants of Bosnia.

During the 13th and 14th century, the Banate of Bosnia gradually expanded, incorporating regions of Soli, Usora, Donji Kraji and Zahumlje. Inhabitants of all those regions also kept their regional individuality. By 1377, the Kingdom of Bosnia was created under the Kotromanić dynasty. It also included several territories of medieval Serbia and Croatia. As a consequence, many Eastern Orthodox Christians and Roman Catholics became subjects of Bosnian rulers, along with adherents of a native Bosnian Church whose origins and nature are a subject of continued debate among scholars. Bošnjani are called that from time of Stephen II i.e. as political subjects of Bosnian rulers. Those belonging to this sect simply called themselves Krstjani ("Christians"). Many scholars have argued that these Bosnian Krstjani were Manichaean dualists related to the Bogomils of Bulgaria, while others question this theory, citing lack of historical evidence. Both Catholic and Orthodox Church authorities considered the Bosnian Church heretical, and launched vigorous proselytizing campaigns to stem its influence. As a result of these divisions, no coherent religious identity developed in medieval Bosnia, as it had in Croatia and Serbia.

Ottoman era

As the centuries passed, the Bosnian kingdom slowly began to decline. It had become fractured by increased political and religious disunity. By then, the Ottoman Turks had already gained a foothold in the Balkans. First defeating the Serbs at the Battle of Kosovo and expanding westward, the Turks eventually conquered all of Bosnia and portions of neighboring Croatia. Territory that partly belonged to the medieval Croatian Kingdom and partly to the Bosnian Kingdom remained under Ottoman rule for centuries, so long that it was referred to as Turkish Croatia (later as Bosanska Krajina).

These developments altered Bosnian history, as many residents adopted Islam, adding to the complex Bosnian ethno-religious identity. The Bosnian Church disappeared, although the circumstances of its decline has been debated as much as defining its nature and origins. Some historians contend that the Bosnian Krstjani converted en masse to Islam, seeking refuge from Catholic and Orthodox persecution. Others argue that the Bosnian Church had already ceased to operate many decades before the Turkish conquest. Whatever the case, a native and distinct Muslim community developed among the Bosnians under Ottoman rule, quickly becoming dominant. By the early 1600s, approximately two-thirds of the Bosnian population was Muslim.

Austro-Hungarian era
During the Austro-Hungarian occupation of Bosnia and Herzegovina from 1878 to 1918, Benjamin Kallay, Joint Imperial Minister of Finance and Vienna-based administrator of Bosnia, promoted Bošnjaštvo, a policy that aimed to inspire in Bosnia's people 'a feeling that they belong to a great and powerful nation'. The policy advocated the ideal of a pluralist and multi-confessional Bosnian nation and viewed Bosnians as "speaking the Bosnian language and divided into three religions with equal rights." The policy tried to isolate Bosnia and Herzegovina from its irredentist neighbors (the Eastern Orthodox in Serbia, Catholics in Croatia, and the Muslims of the Ottoman Empire). The empire tried to discourage the concept of Croat or Serb nationhood, which had spread to Bosnia and Herzegovina's Catholic and Orthodox communities from neighboring Croatia and Serbia in the mid-19th century. Croats and Serbs who opposed the imperial policy and identified with nationalist ideas, ignored claims of Bosnian nationhood and instead counted Bosnian Muslims as part of their own nations, a concept that was rejected by most Bosnian Muslims. Following the death of Kallay, the policy was abandoned. By the latter half of the 1910s, nationalism was an integral factor of Bosnian politics, with national political parties corresponding to the three groups dominating elections.

Yugoslav era
During the period when Yugoslavia was established as a nation, the political establishment in Bosnia and Herzegovina was dominated by Serb and Croat policies; neither of the two terms, Bosnian or Bosniak, was recognized to identify the people as a constituent nation. Consequently, Bosnian Muslims, or anyone who claimed a Bosnian/Bosniak ethnicity, were classified in Yugoslav population statistics as under the category 'regional affiliation.' This classification was used in the last Yugoslav census taken in 1991 in Bosnia and Herzegovina.

The census classifications in former Yugoslavia were often subject to political manipulation because the counting of populations was critical to power of each group. In the constitutional amendments of 1947, Bosnian Muslims requested the option of 'Bosnian.'  But, in the 1948 census, they were given only the choices to identify as 'ethnically undeclared Muslim', 'Serb-Muslim' or 'Croat-Muslim' (the vast majority chose the first option). In the 1953 census, the category "Yugoslav, ethnically undeclared" was introduced; the overwhelming majority of those who identified by this category were Bosnian Muslim.

In the 1961 census, the Bosniaks or Bosnian Muslims were categorized as an ethnic group defined as one of 'Muslim-Ethnic affiliation,' but not as a Yugoslav "constitutive nation" alongside Serbs and Croats. In 1964, the Fourth Congress of the Bosnian Party assured the Bosniaks' of the right to self-determination.  In 1968 at a meeting of the Bosnian Central Committee, Bosniaks were accepted as a distinct nation, though the leadership decided not to use the Bosniak or Bosnian name. Hence, as a compromise, the option of "Muslims by nationality" was introduced as a category in the 1971 census. This was the official category for use by Bosniaks until the final Yugoslav census in 1991.

Modern era
In the 1990s the name Bosniaks was introduced to replace the term "Muslim by nationality". This resulted in Bosniak and Muslim sometimes being used interchangeably in political contexts. In the centuries of the Ottoman Empire, distinctions among citizens (for taxation purposes, military service etc.) was made based primarily on the individual's religious identity, which was closely tied to ethnicity.

The decision of a citizen to identify as Bosnian seems to depend on whether they relate their identity more with the Bosnian state or territory as opposed to their religious affiliation, particularly in the case of Bosniaks. The number of people who identified as Bosnians under the latest (2013) population census is not exactly known, however it is not above 2.73%, as this is the number of people who identified as "Others" and "Bosnians" are listed under this "Others" category.

Religion

According to the latest population census (2013) of Bosnia and Herzegovina, there were relatively few people who identified as "Bosnians", thereby it is difficult to establish the religious connection between this group of people and some of the religions present in that country.

According to Tone Bringa, an author and anthropologist, she says of Bosnia and Bosnians:
"Neither Bosniak, nor Croat, nor Serb identities can be fully understood with reference only to Islam or Christianity respectively but have to be considered in a specific Bosnian context that has resulted in a shared history and locality among Bosnians of Islamic as well as Christian backgrounds."According to Bringa, in Bosnia there is a singular, "trans-ethnic culture" that encompassed each ethnicity and makes different faiths, including Christianity and Islam, "synergistically interdependent".

Still, large numbers of Bosnians are secular, a trend strengthened in the post-World War II in Bosnia and Herzegovina as they were part of the Communist political system that rejected traditional organized religion.

Identification

According to the latest official population census made in Bosnia and Herzegovina, most of the population identified with Bosniak, Croat or Serb ethnicity. Some people identified with "Bosnian" nationality, however these are listed under the category "Others" (along with all the other options such as ethnic Muslims, Jews, Romas etc.). According to the latest population census (2013), there were around 2.7%  "Others".

The CIA World Factbook, used in this article as a source for numbers, does not mention a sole "Bosnian" nationality. Instead, it mentions "Bosnian(s), Herzegovinian(s)", thereby emphasizing the regional significance and equity between the terms.

Ethnic minorities in this territory, such as Jews, Roma, Albanians, Montenegrins and others, may consider "Bosnian" as an adjective modifying their ethnicity (e.g. "Bosnian Roma") to indicate place of residence. Other times, they use (with equal rights) the term "Herzegovinians".

In addition, a sizable population in Bosnia and Herzegovina believe that the term "Bosnians" defines a people who constitute a distinct collective cultural identity or ethnic group. According to the latest (2013) census, however, this population does not rise above 2.7%.

In a 2007 survey conducted by the United Nations Development Programme (UNDP), 57% of those surveyed primarily identified by an ethnic designation, while 43% opted for "being a citizen of Bosnia-Herzegovina". In addition, 75% of the surveyors answered positively to the question "As well as thinking of yourself as a [Bosniak, Croat, Serb], do you also think of yourself as being a citizen of the whole of Bosnia-Herzegovina?". In the same survey, 43% said that they identify as a citizen of Bosnia-Herzegovina as the primary identity, 14% identified with a specific ethnic or religious group, while 41% chose the dual identity.

According to a study conducted by the University of Montenegro, Faculty for Sport and Physical Education in Nikšić, Montenegro and the University of Novi Sad in Serbia, Bosnian people are the tallest in the world.

See also

Herzegovinians
Bosniaks
Serbs of Bosnia and Herzegovina
Croats of Bosnia and Herzegovina
Jews of Bosnia and Herzegovina
List of Bosnian and Herzegovinian people
Army of the Republic of Bosnia and Herzegovina
Bosnian Croat War
Bosnian–Serbian War (1326–1329)
Bosnian War
Bosnian Cyrillic
Culture of Bosnia and Herzegovina
Demographics of Bosnia and Herzegovina
Lilium bosniacum
List of Bosnia and Herzegovina patriotic songs
Republic of Bosnia and Herzegovina
SR Bosnia and Herzegovina
Bosnian Americans

References

Literature

 
 
 
 
 
 
 
 

Bosnia and Herzegovina people
South Slavs